First Love is the second studio album by South Korean pianist Yiruma.

Track listing

References

2001 albums
Yiruma albums